Champion Spalding Chase (March 20, 1820 – November 3, 1898) was an American politician, who served as the first Attorney General of Nebraska, and served seven years as Mayor of Omaha, Nebraska.  He also served in the Wisconsin State Senate and was a Union Army officer in the American Civil War.

Early life and career

Born in Cornish, New Hampshire, the son of Clement Chase (1776–1867) and his second wife, Olive Spalding (1790–1823), of Plainfield, New Hampshire, he was named after his maternal grandfather, Champion Spalding. He grew up in Cornish, on his father's farm, and later attended the Kimball Union Academy in Meriden, New Hampshire. He started teaching in Cornish as an adolescent during the winter and moved later in 1840 to continue his teaching in New York.

In New York, he taught at the Academy in Amsterdam, New York, from 1841 to 1842. By 1843 he had moved to Otsego County to be the vice principal of the West Hartwick Seminary. He resided in New York until the end of the 1840s and studied law in Buffalo.

In 1848, he was admitted to the bar at Canandaigua and, in 1849, he moved to Racine, Wisconsin.

Wisconsin public office

In Wisconsin, Chase became involved in politics.  He attended the first Republican National Convention in 1856 as part of the delegation from Wisconsin.  The convention nominated John C. Frémont as the Republican candidate for the presidency in the 1856 election. The same year, Chase ran for the Wisconsin State Senate and was elected to a two-year term, representing Racine County.

During his second year in the Senate, he served as chairman of the judiciary committee and supervised the revision of the statutes of the state. In 1859, he was elected Prosecuting Attorney for the 1st judicial district in Wisconsin. That same year, he was elected President of the Board of Education for the city of Racine.  Also in 1859, Chase was appointed Brigadier General of the Wisconsin State Militia, by Governor Alexander Randall.

Civil War service

In 1862, with the assistance of his cousin, Salmon P. Chase (1808–1873), who was then the United States Treasury Secretary, he was appointed paymaster in the Union Army with the rank of Major.

He served four years in the Union Army and during this time he was on special duty in the West and Southwest. He was at the sieges of Knoxville, Mobile, and Vicksburg, and in the later part of the war he was headquartered at New Orleans for nearly two years and would receive a brevet to Lieutenant Colonel from President Andrew Johnson late in 1865, for his meritorious services in the Gulf Campaign. In January 1866 he was honorably discharged.

Nebraska

After mustering out of the Army in 1866, Chase moved to Omaha, in the Nebraska Territory, and resumed his law practice. He also became an investor in the incorporation of the Omaha Street Railway Co.  In 1867, Nebraska would be admitted to the Union as the 37th state, and in the state's first general election, Chase was elected to a two-year term as the first Attorney General of Nebraska.

In 1869, he was appointed to a six-year term as regent of the State University of Nebraska, by Governor David Butler.

Chase was elected Mayor of Omaha in 1874, after losing an earlier attempt.  He was re-elected in 1875 to a two-year term—this was the first term after Omaha's mayoralty was changed by statute from a one-year term to a two-year term.  He was elected to two additional two-year terms in 1879 and 1883, but was impeached and removed from office in June 1884, due to drunkenness impairing his abilities. His wife Mary died to cancer in 1882 and many think this may have contributed to his ill health. Chase later launched quo warranto proceedings in 1887 stating that he had been illegally removed from office, and was unlawfully deprived of the salary of the mayor. The jury rendered a verdict in his favor which gave him some measure of closure.

During his terms as Mayor it was recorded of him as having "favoured extensive public improvements" such as parks and boulevards, and direct and gravitational powered waterworks.  As mayor, Colonel Chase received and officially entertained a large number of distinguished people—Kalākaua, King of Hawai'i; Peter II, Emperor of Brazil; the Governor General of Canada; U.S. President and Mrs. Rutherford B. Hayes; President and Mrs. Ulysses S. Grant; Generals William Tecumseh Sherman, Philip Sheridan, George Armstrong Custer, and others.

In 1871, he was elected Grand Senior Warden in the Nebraska Commandary of Knights Templar.  In 1886, he was unanimously chosen president of the Nebraska State Humane Society.

Champion Chase was identified as being past commander of the U.S. Grant Post of the Grand Army of the Republic and the Sons of the American Revolution. In 1891 he was an organiser of the Omaha Real Estate Owner's Association. He was selected as the chairman of the International Pan-Republic Congress on Plan and Scope in the mid 1890s. He was appointed a Collector of Customs for the Port of Omaha and held that office until his death in 1898.

Family and personal life

After arriving in Racine in 1849, Chase married Mary Sophronia Butterfield. Their only son, Champion Clement Chase, was born in 1860, and would eventually become a well-known newspaper publisher in Omaha.

Mary Chase died of cancer in 1882, in Omaha, leaving Chase a widower.  Chase died as the result of a fall on November 3, 1898, at the age of 78.

He was devoted to the memories of his native town, often expressed his loyalty and love for it. He was buried alongside his wife at the Prospect Hills Cemetery in Omaha, Nebraska.

Legacy
Chase County, Nebraska, and the unincorporated community of Champion in Chase County, are named after him as a complimentary act on the part of the Legislature of Nebraska.

References

Sources
The Strangest Names In American Political History : Champion Spalding Chase (1820-1898), Champion Bramwell Mann (1844-1929), Champion Israel Hutchinson (1815-1884), Champion Moore Edmunds (1907-1978)

External links
 Champion Spalding Chase papers (MS 133). Manuscripts and Archives, Yale University Library. 

1820 births
1898 deaths
People from Cornish, New Hampshire
Nebraska Republicans
Lawyers from Omaha, Nebraska
Mayors of Omaha, Nebraska
Nebraska Attorneys General
Republican Party Wisconsin state senators
People of Wisconsin in the American Civil War
Union Army colonels
District attorneys in Wisconsin
School board members in Wisconsin
19th-century American politicians
19th-century American lawyers
Grand Army of the Republic officials